Another Mother Further is the third full-length studio album by Atlanta funk-rock group Mother's Finest. It was released in 1977 on Epic Records and co-produced by Tom Werman. It managed to chart one single, "Piece of the Rock".

"Truth'll Set You Free" was covered by R&B group Labelle on their 2008 album, Back to Now, after Nona Hendryx and Joyce Kennedy performed it on the international Daughters Of Soul tour in 2004.

Track listing
All songs written by Mother's Finest, except where noted.

"Mickey's Monkey" (Lamont Dozier, Brian Holland, Eddie Holland) – 4:42
"Baby Love" – 4:23
"Thank You for the Love" – 5:04
"Piece of the Rock" – 3:23
"Truth'll Set You Free" – 4:23
"Burning Love" (Dennis Linde) – 4:11
"Dis Go Dis Way, Dis Go Dat Way" – 4:14
"Hard Rock Lover" – 3:43

Personnel

Mother's Finest
Joyce "Baby Jean" Kennedy – lead & backing vocal, percussion
Glenn Murdock – lead & backing vocal
Gary "Moses Mo" Moore – guitars
Mike Keck – keyboards, synthesizers, additional percussion
Jerry "Wyzard" Seay – bass, drums, percussion
Barry "B.B. Queen" Borden – drums, percussion

Additional musicians
Joe Lala, "Raymond", Tom Werman – additional percussion

Production
Produced by Tom Werman & Mother's Finest
Recorded & Engineered by Milan Bogdan & Barry Burnett

Charts

Weekly charts

Year-end charts

References

External links
[ "Another Mother Further" at discogs]

1977 albums
Mother's Finest albums
Epic Records albums
Albums produced by Tom Werman